The work of the Labour Party's Governance and Legal Unit in relation to antisemitism, 2014–2019, is a leaked British dossier written by party staff in response to the Equality and Human Rights Commission's investigation into the party's handling of antisemitism complaints and includes reports of other forms of racism. The report reveals emails of senior party management staff, aligned with the right of the party, and alleges obstruction of justice in dealing with cases of antisemitism and other noted cases of racism, and it does not clear the party of accusations of being "institutionally antisemitic". Although the report states that it "thoroughly disproves any suggestion that antisemitism is not a problem in the Party", or that it is all a smear or a witch-hunt, its main assertion is that rampant factionalism within the party had ultimately led to antisemitism and racism allegations not being dealt with properly.

The dossier was first reported by Tom Rayner, political correspondent at Sky News, on Twitter on 11 April 2020, then on Sky News itself a day later. He reported that Labour's lawyers had advised against submitting the report to the commission. The news of this dossier had many activists calling for its full publication; it finally leaked and spread through social media. Keir Starmer, Leader of the Labour Party, and Angela Rayner, Deputy Leader of the Labour Party, announced an investigation into the report the following day.

Background

The Labour Party has been dealing with a rise in antisemitism complaints since Jeremy Corbyn won the 2015 Labour Party leadership election. While complaints regarding proceedings over antisemitism and other forms of racism and discrimination had existed prior to Corbyn's election as leader, over the course of his leadership they seemed to have become more numerous and intense. This has led to several serious issues in the party's approach to antisemitism and failure to deal with it, much of which was associated with Corbyn's alleged inaction.

In May 2019, following complaints submitted by the Jewish Labour Movement and the Campaign Against Antisemitism, the Equality and Human Rights Commission (EHRC) launched a formal investigation into whether Labour had "unlawfully discriminated against, harassed or victimised people because they are Jewish", and specifically whether "unlawful acts have been committed by the party and/or its employees and/or its agents, and; whether the party has responded to complaints of unlawful acts in a lawful, efficient and effective manner." The Labour Party asked the EHRC to communicate any interim recommendations in the course of the investigation.

The report was the result of an internal investigation into Labour's Governance and Legal Unit, which handles disciplinary cases, and was intended to be submitted as the addendum to the party's submission to the EHRC. It was later reported that the Labour Party's most senior lawyer had asserted that the report was deliberately misleading.

Contents of the report
On 4 April 2020, Keir Starmer, who had just won the 2020 Labour Party party leadership election, said he would look to cooperate fully with the EHRC's investigation into antisemitism in the party. The following week, Sky News reported that an 860-page report into the handling of antisemitism by the party, planned to be sent to the EHRC in addition to previous submissions, would be withheld on the advice of lawyers. The report concluded that there was "no evidence" that antisemitism complaints were treated any differently than other forms of complaint, or of current or former staff being "motivated by antisemitic intent". The report also found that Corbyn's leadership staff inherited a lack of "robust processes, systems, training, education and effective line management", and that former senior officials opposed to Corbyn's leadership contributed to "a litany of mistakes", which "affected the expeditious and resolute handling of disciplinary complaints", including providing "false and misleading information" to Corbyn's office on the scale and handling of antisemitism allegations. The report urges the EHRC to "question the validity of the personal testimonies" of former members of staff. The Independent, which saw the dossier in full, stated that Labour Party officials appeared disappointed by Labour's better-than-expected performance in the 2017 United Kingdom election.

The executive summary clearly states that it "thoroughly disproves any suggestion that antisemitism is not a problem in the party, or that it is all a smear or a witch-hunt. The report's findings prove the scale of the problem and could help end the denialism amongst parts of the party membership which has further hurt Jewish members and the Jewish community." The report also included hundreds of private WhatsApp messages and emails from Labour staff members, many of them expressing hostility towards Corbyn or his close allies and bemoaning Labour's better-than-expected performance at the 2017 general election. The officials discussed directing election campaign funds to favoured candidates, including the former deputy leader Tom Watson. The dossier also named complainants in antisemitism cases. It also identified complainants as being Jewish, even where they had not sought to self-identify as such originally, which the anti-racist group Hope not Hate described as "troublingly".

In the period between November 2016 and February 2018, the report claims that of the more than 300 complaints made into anti-semitism, "at least half" of which warranted action, only 34 led to investigations being initiated. While admitting it might not seem immediately clear why this is relevant, the report lists examples of the named figures using insulting and aggressive language towards Labour politicians, staff, and members. This includes terms like "trots" and "bitch face cow". The report describes them repeatedly using derogatory mental health tropes, including terms like "mentalist" and "nutter", and repeatedly disparaged the appearance of party staff and members, using terms like "pube head", "smelly cow", and "fat". The report found they also made comments saying that certain party members should "die in a fire", and that a senior aide's "face would make a good dartboard". According to the report, Labour MPs were also targets as they said that those MPs who nominated Corbyn should be "taken out and shot", amongst other disparaging remarks. Commenters made derogatory comments about Labour politicians including Ed Miliband, Sadiq Khan, Dawn Butler, Diane Abbott, Rachael Maskell, Clive Lewis, and Corbyn. Abbott was allegedly described as "truly repulsive" and "a very angry woman", while fellow black Labour MP Butler's claims to have experienced racism within the Parliamentary Labour Party were said to have been dismissed. There was also one instance of a staffer in the policy unit sharing an Islamophobic clip from right-wing commentator Douglas Murray in the aftermath of the 2017 Westminster attack. The report also documents talk of violence against Corbyn, talking about "hanging and burning" him, calling him a "lying little toerag", claiming "death by fire is too kind for LOTO [Leader of the Opposition]". Senior management were found to be telling staff that they need not be comradely in their attitudes and statements about the leader, to whom they were trying to hide disappointment at better than expeceted results for Labour under him.

The report alleges that the management team co-ordinated in "refusing to share basic information to LOTO during the election", created a "parallel general election campaign", and boasted about "hardly working" during the campaign. There are marked statements about their dismay at Labour over-performing expectations during the campaign, and apparent disappointment with the increase in seats after the election.

Reaction
Many MPs, party members and activists within the Labour Party expressed dismay at the contents of the report and called to launch an investigation into the behaviour detailed in the report, including "the possible misuse of funds" by officials. Labour politicians, such as Andy Burnham and Alex Sobel, spoke out against the emails and practices revealed in the report. BAME Labour members raised concerns over the treatment of black MPs, with hundreds signing open letters to the new leadership that call for internal party reform and increased transparency. Labour staffers tried to stop the party's Unite the Union branch from sending letters of solidarity to the BAME MPs who were named in a leaked internal report as victims of racism and racial profiling from colleagues at Labour HQ.

Labour MP Charlotte Nichols said that "this document should be published in full" and that "Jewish members have a right to know what has happened and to see the evidence." Sobel said: "To read the messages and emails that our own staff conspired to undermine our candidates and starve those in marginal seats of resources is a disgrace. To further read how complaints of antisemitism, Islamophobia, sexual harassment and other complaints were mismanaged due to a toxic internal culture highlights why the EHRC were right to investigate and vindicates the complainants." Momentum called for a full inquiry into the report, including "the possible misuse of funds". Matt Wrack, general secretary of the Fire Brigades Union (FBU), which is affiliated with Labour, called for disciplinary action to be launched against the officials named in the report. He said: "This consistent pattern of corrosive behaviour prioritised damaging the left of the party over both winning elections and dealing swiftly with complaints of antisemitism and other forms of racism – it cannot be allowed to fester any longer in the Labour Party. Keir Starmer has said he wants a united party. He should therefore use his new mandate to urgently address this issue, including taking disciplinary action, as appropriate. These people should never again be in senior positions in the Labour Party. Without this internal wrecking, the hung parliament in 2017 could have instead been a Labour government – those involved should wear that for the rest of their professional lives."

Corbyn told Middle East Eye: "I always knew that there was a culture in the Labour party that was not a healthy one, of an almost self-perpetuating bureaucracy. All organisations have a degree of self-perpetuating bureaucracy about them." A submission by Corbyn and eight other colleagues to the Forde Report's inquiry was said to have accused officials of sabotage and claimed their diversion of funds could constitute fraud. The diverted funds refer to the Bespoke Materials Service, sometimes referred to as the Ergon House Project, which represented 1.2 per cent of Labour's total election expenditures and was focused towards certain Labour-held seats rather than offensive targets. Officials have maintained their targeting was due to legitimate fears Labour would lose seats, based on its poor polling position at the start of the campaign, and said that three of the seats supported by BMS were less than 500 votes away from being lost to the Conservatives. The 2017 campaigns chief, Patrick Heneghan, also stated that Corbyn's office had demanded he divert funds towards a list of Labour-held seats, some with majorities of over 10,000, to help MPs who were considered allies of Corbyn, including Ian Lavery and Jon Trickett. Heneghan maintained the use of funds in BMS was legal, as it had been authorised by Iain McNicol, the-then General Secretary of the Labour Party, and claimed it had been kept from Corbyn's office because staffers believed they were "in a bind" and "felt it was pointless to try and discuss this sensibly with Jeremy’s staff".

The Guardian reported that there was "seemingly no proof of active obstruction" by Labour officials during the 2017 general election and that any evidence was "circumstantial rather than a smoking gun". According to John Ware, the leaked report included no evidence of an intention by party officials to sabotage the election in order to deprive Corbyn of the chance of becoming the prime minister. New Statesman political editor Stephen Bush stated that "the report's summary writes a cheque its findings cannot cash", and emphasised concerns about the privacy and welfare of the complainants named within the report. An unredacted version was circulated on social media, which led to worries of Jewish activists that they would be targeted by antisemites for speaking up. The report was also criticised by the Campaign Against Antisemitism, who believed it had been written to absolve the Corbyn leadership of the failure to deal with antisemitism.

Investigation
In response to the report's leak, Keir Starmer and Angela Rayner issued a joint statement:

"We have seen a copy of an apparently internal report about the work of the Labour Party's Governance and Legal Unit in relation to antisemitism. The content and the release of the report into the public domain raise a number of matters of serious concern. We will therefore commission an urgent independent investigation into this matter. This investigation will be instructed to look at three areas.
 The background and circumstances in which the report was commissioned and the process involved.
 The contents and wider culture and practices referred to in the report.
 Third, the circumstances in which the report was put into the public domain.

We have also asked for immediate sight of any legal advice the Labour Party has already received about the report. In the meantime, we ask everyone concerned to refrain from drawing conclusions before the investigation is complete and we will be asking the GS to put measures in place to protect the welfare of party members and party staff who are concerned or affected by this report."

John McDonnell,  former Shadow Chancellor of the Exchequer, called for the immediate suspension of some former staff named in the document, pending the results of the independent investigation, and the document should be provided to the EHRC investigation into the party. He said: "They've got to have access to all of the information. We've got to rid ourselves of this culture that prevented a Labour government when we desperately needed one but also, by the looks of it, undermined the party's ability to deal with antisemitism effectively" and wrote that "the revelations in the leaked Labour report are a genuine scandal."

On 23 April, the National Executive Committee of the Labour Party (NEC) held a meeting via Zoom to agree the terms of reference for the independent investigation into the circumstances, contents, and release of an internal report to conclude with its own report being published by mid-July. Several amendments were passed by the NEC, including one moved by Rayner that referred to the offer of whistleblower protections. On 1 May, the NEC appointed a four-person panel to investigate the report on the party's handling of internal antisemitism complaints. Barrister Martin Forde was chosen by the NEC to chair the independent inquiry. He was supported by three Labour peers: Debbie Wilcox, Baroness Wilcox of Newport, a councillor and former leader of Newport City Council; Larry Whitty, Baron Whitty, a former Labour general secretary; and Ruth Lister, Baroness Lister of Burtersett, a social policy professor. Momentum chair and NEC member Jon Lansman proposed Alf Dubs, Baron Dubs, as a panel member because there was no Jewish representation. This was voted down in the meeting, including by Starmer, on the grounds that Dubs had supported Starmer's leadership bid; another NEC member also argued that Dubs was a higher-profile backer of Starmer, and an NEC member said that Baroness Wilcox backed Starmer's leadership campaign. Another factor considered was gender balance, particularly as the chair chosen is male. The vote on the proposal to include Dubs was lost 18–16; there was a request during the meeting for a new vote after one NEC member argued that Wilcox had supported both Starmer and Rosena Allin-Khan, liked tweets that attacked Corbyn and Unite the Union, and promoted the NEC's slate of Labour First.

In June 2020, Labour's press office provided a statement prepared by party lawyers to journalists covering the story that defended the comments, describing criticism as "po-faced", and stated: "These were messages exchanged between co-workers in the expectation that they would remain private and confidential and the tone of the language used reflects that." In response, 13 NEC members (one third of the NEC), including representatives from four trade unions (Transport Salaried Staffs' Association, Fire Brigades Union, Associated Society of Locomotive Engineers and Firemen, and Unite the Union) wrote to Starmer, accusing his office of misleading them about how the party dealt with leaked WhatsApp messages by senior officials detailed in the report and accusing party officials of defending "racist, sexist and abusive" messages about colleagues, and "also directly prejudged the specific issues that Martin Forde's inquiry is considering ... and thereby undermines its independence". The NEC members called for an apology and retraction from Starmer.

See also
Antisemitism in the UK Conservative Party
Antisemitism in the United Kingdom
Islamophobia in the UK Conservative Party (1997–present)

References

External links
Terms of reference set by Labour NEC for investigation into leaked report – full text at LabourList

2020 in British politics
Antisemitism in the United Kingdom
Labour Party (UK) reports
Left-wing antisemitism
News leaks
Political corruption
Racism in the United Kingdom
Sexism in the United Kingdom